Thagana or Sagana can refer to:

Rivers
 Thagana, Kenyan Kikuyu name for the Tana River
 Thagana or Sagana River, a tributary of the Tana River

Places
 Sagana, a geographical settlement near the Tana River
 Thagana, an alternate name for the town Sagana
 Sagana, an early name for what became Saginaw, Michigan